Karl Justin Koepfer (born October 7, 1934) is a former American football player who played for Detroit Lions of the National Football League (NFL). He played college football at Bowling Green State University.

References

1934 births
Living people
Bowling Green Falcons football players
Detroit Lions players
American football offensive linemen
People from Swanton, Ohio